Proto-Turkic is the linguistic reconstruction of the common ancestor of the Turkic languages that was spoken by the Proto-Turks before their divergence into the various Turkic peoples. Proto-Turkic separated into Oghur (western) and Common Turkic (eastern) branches. Candidates for the proto-Turkic homeland range from western Central Asia to Manchuria, with most scholars agreeing that it lay in the eastern part of the Central Asian steppe, while one author has postulated that Proto-Turkic originated 2,500 years ago in East Asia.

The oldest records of a Turkic language, the Old Turkic Orkhon inscriptions of the 7th century Göktürk khaganate, already shows characteristics of Eastern Common Turkic. For a long time, the reconstruction of Proto-Turkic relied on comparisons of Old Turkic with early sources of the Western Common Turkic branches, such as Oghuz and Kypchak, as well as the Western Oghur proper (Bulgar, Chuvash, Khazar). Because early attestation of these non-easternmost languages is much more sparse, reconstruction of Proto-Turkic still rests fundamentally on the easternmost Old Turkic of the Göktürks, however it now also includes a more comprehensive analysis of all written and spoken forms of the language.

The Proto Turkic language shows evidence of influence from several neighboring language groups, including Eastern Iranian, Tocharian, and Old Chinese.

Phonology

Consonants 
The consonant system had a two-way contrast of stop consonants (fortis vs. lenis), k, p, t vs. g, b, d. There was also an affricate consonant, ç; at least one sibilant s and sonorants m, n, ń, ŋ, r, ŕ, l, ĺ with a full series of nasal consonants. 

The sounds denoted by ń, ĺ, ŕ refer to palatalized sounds and have been claimed by Altaicists to be direct inheritances from Proto-Altaic. The last two can be reconstructed with the aid of the Oghur languages, which show  for *ŕ, *ĺ, while Common Turkic has *z, *š. Oghuric is thus sometimes referred to as Lir-Turkic and Common Turkic as Shaz-Turkic.

However, an alternate theory holds that Common Turkic is closer to the original state of affairs and reconstructs Proto-Turkic *z, *š. The glottochronological reconstruction based on analysis of isoglosses and Sinicisms points to the timing of the r/z split at around 56 BCE–48 CE. As A. V. Dybo puts it, that may be associated with

the historical situation that can be seen in the history of the Huns' division onto the Northern and Southern [groups]: the first separation and withdrawal of the Northern Huns to the west has occurred, as was stated above, in 56 BC,... the second split of the (Eastern) Huns into the northern and southern groups happened in 48 AD.

Dybo suggests that during that period, the Northern branch steadily migrated from Western Mongolia through Southern Xinjiang into the north's Dzungaria and then finally into Kazakhstan's Zhetysu until the 5th century.

There was no fortis-lenis contrast in word-initial position: the initial stops were always *b, *t, *k, the affricate was always *č (*ç) and the sibilant was always *s. In addition, the nasals and the liquids did not occur in that position either.

The velars /k/ and /g/ seem to have had back and front allophones ([q] and [k], [ɢ] and [g]) according to their environments, and the lenis stops /b/, /d/ and /g/ may have tended towards fricatives intervocalically.

Vowels 
Like most of its descendants, Proto-Turkic exhibited vowel harmony, distinguishing vowel qualities a, e, ı, o, u vs. ä, ë, ï, ö, ü, as well as two vowel quantities. Here, macrons represent long vowels. The existence of a mid back unrounded *e is not accepted by all scholars, nor is that of a mid front unrounded *ë. The phonemicity of the distinction between the two close unrounded vowels, i.e. front *ï and back *ı, is also rejected by some.

Morphology 
This section deals mainly with Róna-Tas (1998). However, some of his reconstructions of Proto-Turkic have some Common Turkic features like substituting *-z for palatalized *-ŕ.

Nouns 
Plural of nouns are formed by the suffix *-lAr, however, the Chuvash plural -sem <> seems to be a late replacement. Reconstructable possessive suffixes in Proto-Turkic includes  *-m,  *-ŋ, and  *-(s)i, plurals of the possessors are formed by *-z in Common Turkic languages.

Verbs 
The reconstructable suffixes for the verbs include:
 Aorist: *-Vr
 Past: *-dI
 Negative suffix: *-mA 
 : *-m < *-män < *bän
 : *-n < *sän
 : *-∅ < *ï
 : *-mïz/*-bïz < *bïz
 : *-sïz < *sïz
Proto-Turkic also involves derivation with grammatical voice suffixes, as in cooperative *körüš, middle *körün, passive *körül, and causative *körtkür.

Vocabulary

Pronouns

Numbers

References

Sources

Further reading
 Dybo, A.V. (2014). "Early contacts of Turks and problems of Proto-Turkic reconstruction". In: Tatarica: Language, 2, p. 7-17.

External links

Agglutinative languages
Turkic languages
Turkic